Fort Washakie was a U.S. Army fort in what is now the U.S. state of Wyoming.  The fort was established in 1869 and named Camp Augur after General Christopher C. Augur, commander of the Department of the Platte.  In 1870 the camp was renamed Camp Brown in honor of Captain Frederick H. Brown, who was killed in the Fetterman Massacre in 1866.

It was renamed again in 1878 in honor of Chief Washakie of the Shoshone tribe, making the fort one of the only U.S. military outposts named after a Native American. (Another fort named for a Native American was Fort E.S. Parker, the original Crow Agency in Montana that operated from 1869 to 1875, which was named after the Seneca lawyer Eli Parker, who was a General under Ulysses Grant.)

Fort Washakie was operated as a military outpost until 1909, when it was decommissioned and turned over to the Shoshone Indian Agency.  The graves of Washakie and Lewis and Clark Expedition guide Sacajawea are located on the grounds of the fort. The site is included within  the present-day Wind River Indian Reservation.

References

External links

Fort Washakie, Building No. 1, Washakie Street, Fort Washakie, Fremont, WY at the Historic American Buildings Survey (HABS)
Fort Washakie, Building No. 67, Sacajawea Circle, Fort Washakie, Fremont, WY at HABS
Fort Washakie, Building No. 68, Sacajawea Circle, Fort Washakie, Fremont, WY at HABS
Fort Washakie, Building No. 69, Sacajawea Circle, Fort Washakie, Fremont, WY at HABS
Fort Washakie, Building No. 70, Sacajawea Circle, Fort Washakie, Fremont, WY at HABS
Fort Washakie, Building No. 71, Sacajawea Circle, Fort Washakie, Fremont, WY at HABS
Fort Washakie, Building No. 72, Sacajawea Circle, Fort Washakie, Fremont, WY at HABS
Fort Washakie, Building No. 73, Sacajawea Circle, Fort Washakie, Fremont, WY at HABS
Fort Washakie, Building No. 74, Sacajawea Circle, Fort Washakie, Fremont, WY at HABS

Washakie
Closed installations of the United States Army
Buildings and structures in Fremont County, Wyoming
Wyoming Territory
Civilian Conservation Corps in Wyoming
Historic American Buildings Survey in Wyoming
Historic districts on the National Register of Historic Places in Wyoming
National Register of Historic Places in Fremont County, Wyoming
1869 establishments in Wyoming Territory
Wind River Indian Reservation